John Edward Brockelbank (February 23, 1931 – February 3, 2020) was an instrument technician and former political figure in Saskatchewan, Canada. He represented Saskatoon City from 1964 to 1967, Saskatoon Mayfair from 1967 to 1975 and Saskatoon Westmount from 1975 to 1982 and 1986 to 1991 as a member of the NDP.

He was born in Tisdale, Saskatchewan, in 1931, the son of John Hewgill Brockelbank and Ellen Buchanan Bell, and was educated in Steen, Regina and Westminster, England. In 1954, he married Ina Marie Boyle. He was Minister of Public Works in 1972 and Minister of Government Services and Minister of Telephones from 1972 to 1975. Brockelbank served as speaker for the Saskatchewan assembly from 1975 to 1982. He died on February 3, 2020, at the age of 88.

References 

Saskatchewan New Democratic Party MLAs
Speakers of the Legislative Assembly of Saskatchewan
1931 births
2020 deaths
Members of the Executive Council of Saskatchewan